William Butler (born 1968) is an American actor, writer, director, make-up artist, special effects technician and producer.

History
Butler is known for playing characters who are killed off in many of the horror films that he has appeared in. He has starred in Friday the 13th Part VII: The New Blood as Michael, Night of the Living Dead as Tom, Leatherface: The Texas Chainsaw Massacre III as Ryan, and as Ben in two episodes of the television show Freddy's Nightmares. He has claimed to be upset with how the 4th and 5th Return of The Living Dead turned out.

William Butler grew up working the carnival circuit that his parents owned and operated. When asked about what got him into acting he replied:

Butler authored a memoir entitled Tawdry Tales and Confessions from Horror’s Boy Next Door which was released in 2021.
In the book, Butler came out as gay.

Filmography

Live-action roles
 Power Rangers: Lost Galaxy - Crumummy (voice)
 Power Rangers: Turbo - Maniac Mechanic (voice, uncredited)

Films
 Stay Tuned For Murder (1987) - Sergent 
 Terror Night (1987) - Chip
 Ghoulies 2 (1987) - Merle
 Friday the 13th Part VII: The New Blood (1988) - Michael
 Arena (1989) - Skull
 Leatherface: The Texas Chainsaw Massacre III (1990) - Ryan
 Buried Alive (1990) - Tim
 Night of the Living Dead (1990) - Tom Bitner
 Spellcaster (1992) - Billy
 Watchers 3 (1994) - Tom
 Leather Jacket Love Story (1997) - Julian
 Dead Country (2008) - Narrator

Crew work

Director
 Black Velvet Pantsuit (1995)
 Madhouse (2004)
 Costume Party Capers: The Incredibles (2004)
 Furnace (2007)
 Demonic Toys 2 (2010)
 3 Bears Christmas (2019)
 Bunker of Blood: Chapter 8: Butcher's Bake Off: Hell's Kitchen (2019) Video
 The Three Bears and the Perfect Gift (2019)
 Crashing Christmas (2020) (TV Movie)
 Dead Voices (2020)
 The Resonator: Miskatonic U (2021)
 Baby Oopsie (2021)
 Beyond the Resonator (2022)
 My Babysitter the Super Hero (2022)

Writer
 Black Velvet Pantsuit (1995)
 Madhouse (2004)
 Return of the Living Dead: Necropolis (2005)
 Return of the Living Dead: Rave to the Grave (2005)
 The Gingerdead Man (2005)
 Furnace (2007)
 Gingerdead Man 2: Passion of the Crust (2008)
 Gingerdead Man 3: Saturday Night Cleaver (2011)
 Shine! (2015)
 Mama Don't Make ME Put On The Dress Again (2017) (Video short)
 The Lift (2018) (Short)
 Break Your Heart (2018) (Video short)
 3 Bears Christmas (2019)
 Barbie & Kendra Save The Tiger King (2020) (Video)
 Barbie & Kendra Storm Area 51 (2020)
 Crashing Christmas (2020) (TV Movie)
 The Resonator: Miskatonic U (2021)
 Baby Oopsie (2021)
 Beyond the Resonator (2022)
 My Babysitter the Super Hero (2022)

References

External links

Place of birth missing (living people)
Living people
American male film actors
American film directors
American male voice actors
American screenwriters
American gay actors
LGBT film directors
LGBT people from California
American gay artists
1968 births